The Sammarinese records in swimming are the fastest ever performances of swimmers from San Marino, which are recognised and ratified by the San Marino Swimming Federation (FSN).

All records were set in finals unless noted otherwise.

Long Course (50 m)

Men

Women

Mixed relay

Short Course (25 m)

Men

Women

Mixed relay

References
General
Sammarinese Long Course Records – Men 31 August 2022 updated
Sammarinese Long Course Records – Women8 August 2021 updated
Sammarinese Short Course Records – Men 31 August 2022 updated
Sammarinese Short Course Records – Women 26 April 2021 updated
Specific

External links
FSN web site
FSN records page

San Marino
Records
Swimming